Agigea is a commune in Constanța County, Romania.

Agigea may also refer to:

Lake Agigea
Agigea River